Gruffudd or Gruffydd ( or , in either case) is a Welsh name, originating in Old Welsh as a given name and today used as both a given and surname. It is the origin of the Anglicised name Griffith[s], and was historically sometimes treated as interchangeable with the etymologically unrelated Germanic name Galfrid (Latinised as Galfridus). The Welsh form evolved from the Common Brittonic Grippiud or Gripuid.

Evolution and history
One of the oldest forms which gave rise to all other variations is Grippiud or Gripuid, which evolved into Old Welsh Griffudd. The second element of the name, iudd, as a noun has a meaning of 'lord' and is found in other Welsh names such as Meredith (Mared[i]udd) and Bleidd[i]udd. In North Wales Griffudd evolved into Gruffudd.  “When u came to have the same quality as the clear y (the y of monosyllables and final syllables) the name generally became Gruffydd, and this is now regarded as the standard form,” according to T.J. Morgan and Prys Morgan.  Gruffudd of Old Welsh became spelt as Gruffydd in Middle Welsh and Modern Welsh of today. The high central vowel sound of u/y was lost entirely in South Wales and replaced by the i sound, and the form Griffidd became standard in the south, the region to first be encountered by Anglo-Norman scribes.

Variations
Anglo-Norman scribes rendered Griffidd and Gruffydd  as Griffith, with both Gruffydd and Griffith becoming the standardized forms for the same name since the High Middle Ages and into the modern era.  The form of the name encountered in Latin texts is Griffith, Griffini and Gruffin.

Many variations have evolved since the Middle Ages and Tudor period, with many springing from abbreviated forms such as Griff.

Griffri, Griffith, Griffyn, Griffei, Griffies, Griffitte, Griffits, Griffitts, Griffes, Griffyths, Gripthis, Gripphes, Griffithi, Griffen, Griffee, Griffey, Gruffudd, Gruffydd

Patronymics evolving from Griffith include Griffiths and Griffyths, son of Griffith.

Hypocoristic forms
Hypocoristic forms, or “pet names”, included Guto, Gutyn, Gitto, Getyn, Gitton, and Gutta, with many of these becoming surnames themselves.  Derivations of Gruffydd by way of Guto/Gitto include Gittos, Gittose, Gittoss, Gittas, Gyttes, Gitts, Gytts, Gittus, Gitthouse, Gyttors, Gittonce, Gittal, Gittall, Gyttall, Gittall, Gethyn. 

The name Gatehouse may have originated in some parts of Wales and the March from Gittose or a variant as a conscious effort to further anglicize the name.

Names
The name may refer to the following people, often with either spelling used, among other variants such as Gruffuth, Griffudd, etc. :

As a given name

 Gruffudd ab Adda (fl. mid 14th century) was a Welsh language poet and musician
 Gruffudd ab Owain Glyndŵr (c. 1375 – c. 1412)  led a major revolt in Wales
 Gruffudd ab yr Ynad Coch (1277–1282), Welsh court poet
 Gruffydd ap Cynan
 Gruffudd ap Cynan ab Owain Gwynedd, the grandson of the king of Gwynedd
 Gruffudd Fychan I
 Gruffudd Fychan II
 Gruffudd Gryg (1340–1380), Welsh poet from Anglesey, North Wales
 Gruffydd ap Gwenwynwyn
 Gruffudd Hiraethog (died 1564), Welsh language poet
 Gruffydd ap Llywelyn
 Gruffydd ap Llywelyn Fawr (c. 1198 – March 1, 1244), son of Llywelyn the Great
 Gruffudd Llwyd (1380–1410), Welsh language poet
 Gruffydd ap Madog Fychan
 Gruffydd II ap Madog, Lord of Dinas Bran
 Gruffydd Maelor
 Gruffudd ap Nicolas
Gruffydd Robert, Welsh priest
 Gruffydd ap Rhydderch
 Gruffydd ap Rhys
 Gruffydd ap Rhys II
 Gruffudd Vychan, (born 1395), Lord of Burgedin, Treflydan, Garth and Gearfawr, Wales

As a surname or patronymic 

Ioan Gruffudd (born 1973), Welsh actor
Rhodri ap Gruffudd (1230–1315), the third or fourth son of Gruffydd ap Llywelyn Fawr

See also
Galfrid
Griffith (name)
Griffith (surname)
Griffiths

References

Welsh masculine given names
Surnames of Welsh origin